Rasskazovo is a town in Tambov Oblast, Russia, located on the Lesnoy Tambov River (Tsna's tributary) at its confluence with the Arzhenka River  east of Tambov. Population:

History
It was founded in 1698 and named after Stepan Rasskazov, a native of Morshansk and the first settler in the area. In the 18th–early 20th century, Rasskazovo was known for its cottage industries, such as stocking knitting, skin dressing, candle and soap production. In 1753, a cloth factory was built and later a dyeing manufactory. Rasskazovo was granted town status in 1926.

Administrative and municipal status
Within the framework of administrative divisions, Rasskazovo serves as the administrative center of Rasskazovsky District, even though it is not a part of it. As an administrative division, it is incorporated separately as the town of oblast significance of Rasskazovo—an administrative unit with the status equal to that of the districts. As a municipal division, the town of oblast significance of Rasskazovo is incorporated as Rasskazovo Urban Okrug.

References

Notes

Sources

Cities and towns in Tambov Oblast
Populated places established in 1698
1698 establishments in Russia
Tambovsky Uyezd